Friedrich Georg Weitsch (8 August 1758, Braunschweig – 30 May 1828, Berlin) was a German painter and etcher.

Life and work

His father, Pascha Johann Friedrich Weitsch, was a well-known artist. His younger brother, also became a painter.

He initially studied with his father. After 1776, he continued his studies with Johann Heinrich Tischbein in Kassel. After studying at the Kunstakademie Düsseldorf with Lambert Krahe, he obtained a position with the lacquerware manufacturer, where his father was a painting instructor.

From 1784 to 1787, he lived abroad; first in Amsterdam, then in Rome and Florence. Upon returning home, he received an invitation from Charles William Ferdinand, Duke of Brunswick, to work as his court painter. In that capacity, he created numerous portraits of the Duke and his family; both in Braunschweig and at Salzdahlum Castle. His portraits often showed the influence of Anton Graff.

In 1794, he was elected a member of the Prussian Academy of Arts, Berlin, and married Elizabeth Schroeder. The marriage was childless. Following the death of Bernhard Rode, he went to the academy to teach art history. He was named a Rector in 1798. That same year, he was appointed a Royal Court Painter.

Selected paintings

Sources
 
 Walther G. Oschilewski: "Erinnerung an Friedrich Georg Weitsch. Sein Wirken als Hofmaler und Akademiedirektor in Berlin",  In: Verein für die Geschichte Berlins, Jahrbuch „Der Bär von Berlin“. #23, Berlin 1978
 Norman-Mathias Pingel: "Weitsch, Friedrich Georg", In: Manfred Garzmann, Wolf-Dieter Schuegraf (Eds.): Braunschweiger Stadtlexikon, Joh. Heinr. Meyer Verlag, Braunschweig 1996, pg. 136
 Gert-Dieter Ulferts: Weitsch, Friedrich Georg. In:  Horst-Rüdiger Jarck, Günter Scheel (Eds.): Braunschweigisches Biographisches Lexikon – 19. und 20. Jahrhundert, Hahnsche Buchhandlung, Hannover 1996, pg. 644.
 Reimar F. Lacher: Friedrich Georg Weitsch (1758–1828). Maler, Kenner, Akademiker. Berlin 2005,

External links 

 More works by Weitsch @ ArtNet

18th-century German painters
18th-century German male artists
German male painters
19th-century German painters
19th-century German male artists
1758 births
1828 deaths
Artists from Braunschweig
People from the Duchy of Brunswick
Court painters
Kunstakademie Düsseldorf alumni
Academic staff of the Prussian Academy of Arts